Bang Bua Thong is a district (amphoe) of Nonthaburi province, central Thailand.

Geography
Neighbouring districts are (from north clockwise) Lat Lum Kaeo (Pathum Thani province), Pak Kret, Mueang Nonthaburi, Sai Noi, and Bang Yai.

Administration
The district is divided into eight sub-districts (tambons), which are further subdivided into 81 villages (mubans). There are five town municipalities (thesaban mueang): Bang Bua Thong, which covers tambons Sano Loi and parts of tambons Bang Bua Thong, Bang Rak Yai, Phimon Rat, and Bang Rak Phatthana; Phimon Rat, which covers most parts of the tambon of the same name; Bang Rak Phatthana, which covers most parts of the tambon of the same name; Bang Khu Rat, which covers the tambon of the same name; and Mai Bang Bua Thong, which covers most parts of tambons Bang Bua Thong. There are a further three tambon administrative organizations (TAO).

References

External links
amphoe.com (Thai)

Bang Bua Thong